Olivier Bouillère (born 1970) is a French writer, whose works are published by the . Olivier Bouillère is an architect.

Publications 
 Rétro, P.O.L, 2008 
 Le Poivre, P.O.L, 2012

Prizes and distinctions 
 2013: Prix Françoise Sagan for Le Poivre

External links 
 Guillaume Gallienne, Le poivre, un roman "épicé" d'Olivier Bouillère on France Inter
 Olivier Bouillère Le Poivre on YouTube
 Olivier Bouillère, Rétro on Arte
 Biographie on Éditions P.O.L
 Le poivre d’Olivier Bouillère on Lire, relire, ne pas lire
 Olivier Bouillère on France Culture

1970 births
20th-century French non-fiction writers
20th-century French male writers
21st-century French non-fiction writers
Living people